Ciocchi Del Monte is an Italian aristocratic family and Italian surname. Notable people with the surname include:

Giovanni Maria Ciocchi del Monte - Pope Julius III
Innocenzo Ciocchi Del Monte - a notorious cardinal

See also
Ciocchi
del Monte (surname)

Italian-language surnames